Sekher-e Sofla (also Romanized as Sekher-e Soflá) is a village in Sar Firuzabad Rural District, Firuzabad District, Kermanshah County, Kermanshah Province, Iran. At the 2006 census, its population was 51, in 11 families.

References 

Populated places in Kermanshah County